The 85th Infantry Regiment is an infantry regiment in the United States Army.

History and lineage
The 85th Infantry was briefly activated during World War I but never sent overseas then reactivated during World War II at Camp Hale in 1942, with three battalions, and attached to the 10th Mountain Division.

Constituted 31 July 1918 in the Regular Army as the 85th Infantry and assigned to the 18th Infantry Division. Organized September 1918 at Camp Travis, Texas from personnel of the 35th Infantry Regiment. Relieved from the 18th Division and demobilized 13 February 1919 at Camp Travis.

Reconstituted 10 July 1943 in the Army of the United States as the 85th Infantry. activated 15 July 1943 at Camp Hale, Colorado. assigned to the 10th Mountain Division, 15 July 1943 Redesignated 85th Mountain Infantry and assigned to the 10th Mountain Division 6 November 1944. Inactivated 30 November 1945 at Camp Carson, Colorado. Redesignated 85th Infantry and assigned to 10th Infantry Division 18 June 1948, allotted to the regular Army 25 June 1948. Activated 1 July 1948 at Fort Riley, Kansas. Inactivated 1 July 1957 in Germany.

The 3rd Battalion, 85th Infantry Regiment was reactivated at Fort Drum, NY on 22 August 2007 as the warrior transition unit for Fort Drum NY and the Northeastern United States.

Campaign streamers
World War II
 North Apennines
 Po Valley

Medal of Honor
 John D. Magrath

Distinctive unit insignia
 Description
A Silver color metal and enamel device 1 3/16 inches (3.02 cm) in height overall consisting of a shield blazoned:  Per fess dancetté Azure and Argent, in chief a ram’s head affronté of the second and in base a jack boot Vert.  Attached below and to the sides of the shield a Blue scroll turned Silver inscribed "FIX BAYONETS" in Silver letters.
 Symbolism
The blue is for Infantry and the ram’s head symbolizes a unit skilled in mountain activity.  The white (silver) base with the dancetté partition line represents snow-capped mountains and the green boot is an allusion to service in Italy.
 Background
The distinctive unit insignia was approved on 18 May 1951.

Coat of arms
Blazon
 Shield- Per fess dancetté Azure and Argent, in chief a ram’s head affronté of the second and in base a jack boot Vert.
 Crest- None.
 Motto- FIX BAYONETS.
Symbolism
 Shield- The blue is for Infantry and the ram’s head symbolizes a unit skilled in mountain activity.  The white base with the dancetté partition line represents snow-capped mountains and the green boot is an allusion to service in Italy.
 Crest:   None.
Background- The coat of arms was approved on 18 May 1951.

References 

 https://web.archive.org/web/20120929200847/http://www.tioh.hqda.pentagon.mil/Heraldry/ArmyDUISSICOA/ArmyHeraldryUnit.aspx?u=7962
 https://web.archive.org/web/20111005104926/http://www.10thmtndivassoc.org/85thhistory.pdf
 Chronology of the 10th Mountain Division in World War II

085